Martin's Day is a 1985 American drama film directed by Alan Gibson. It stars Richard Harris and Lindsay Wagner.

Synopsis 
The film follows an escaped convict named Martin who kidnaps a boy, also named Martin, while trying to flee via plane. While on the run the two Martins discover that they have many things in common other than just their name and begin to bond.

Cast
Richard Harris as Martin Steckert
Lindsay Wagner as Dr. Mennen
James Coburn as Lt. Lardner
Justin Henry as Martin
Karen Black as Karen
John Ireland as Brewer
Saul Rubinek as Hitchhiker
R.H. Thompson as Paul Mennen

Production 
Filming for Martin's Day took place in Ontario, Canada during the autumn of 1984, and began shortly after Richard Harris completed an eight-city tour of the musical Camelot. The film's script was written by Chris Bryant and Allan Scott.

Release 
Initially intended to release in November 1984, Martin's Day premiered in the United States on February 22, 1985.

Reception 
Critical reception was mixed. The Kansas City Star's Robert C. Trussell expressed disappointment in the film, criticizing the lack of acting chemistry between Henry and Harris. A reviewer for the Austin American-Statesman viewed it as a contender for the year's worst film and noted that the filming was done so quickly after Harris's Camelot tour that his hair still bore traces of the orange hair dye used for his performance as King Arthur.

David Pickering of the Corpus Christi Times was more favorable, praising Harris's acting. Martha Steimel of the Wichita Falls Times was similarly favorable citing Henry's acting as a highlight.

See also 
A Perfect World (1993)

References

External links
Martin's Day tribute/fan website

1985 films
Films about child abduction in the United States
Films directed by Alan Gibson
Films about hostage takings
Metro-Goldwyn-Mayer films
American drama road movies
1980s drama road movies
United Artists films
1985 drama films
1980s English-language films
1980s American films